Scott Sidney (1872 – 20 July 1928), born Harry Wilbur Siggins, was an American film director. He directed 117 films between 1913 and 1927.

He died in London, England, United Kingdom.

Selected filmography

Director
 The Adventures of Shorty (1914)
 The Winged Idol (1915)
 The Toast of Death (1915) (uncredited)
 The Green Swamp (1916)
 The Road to Love (1916)
 Tarzan of the Apes (1918)
 813 (1920)
 The Adventures of Tarzan (1921)
 Call the Wagon (1923)
 Reckless Romance (1924)
 Hold Your Breath (1924)
 Charley's Aunt (1925)
 Madame Behave (1925)
 Stop Flirting (1925)
 The Million Dollar Handicap (1925)
 Seven Days (1925)
 The Nervous Wreck (1926)
 The Wrong Mr. Wright (1927)
 No Control (1927)

Screenwriter
 Alf's Carpet (1929)

External links

1872 births
1928 deaths
American film directors
American male screenwriters
Articles containing video clips
20th-century American male writers
20th-century American screenwriters